María Mercedes Milá Mencos (born 4 April 1951) is a Spanish television presenter and journalist, most notable for her work on Spain's Telecinco's  Gran Hermano, the Spanish version of the reality television series Big Brother.

Biography 
Mercedes Milá was born in Esplugues de Llobregat on 5 April 1951, the daughter of José Luis Milá Sagnier, Count of Montseny, and Mercedes Mencos, and eldest of six brothers and sisters (including newscaster Lorenzo Milá). She studied Philosophy, but abandoned it and then  studied journalism and arts in Barcelona, where he got a Bachelor's degree. She first worked as journalist in El Correo de Andalucía, in Sevilla. Shortly afterwards she began working in the newsrooms of Spanish public broadcaster Televisión Española. She joined the sports division, where she remained between 1974 and 1978, when she was selected to co-host, along with Isabel Tenaille, the talk show Dos por Dos ("Two by Two"). After the show was cancelled, Milá returned to radio. She worked with Iñaki Gabilondo in Cadena SER.

Milá's TV comeback came in 1982 with the program Buenas Noches ("Goodnight"), which became one of the hits of the season and lasted until 1984. Her personal style and directness with her guests helped her turn into one of the most popular Spanish TV personalities of the 1980s. After a brief stint with the Catalan television station TV3, and then back in TVE in 1990, she moved over to new private TV network  Antena 3 in the early nineties, where she stayed until moving to private broadcaster Telecinco in 2000.

In 2000 she found renewed success as the host of the Spanish franchise of hit reality show Gran Hermano, earning poor critical reviews but massive ratings. As of 2017, Milá has hosted fifteen of the seventeen regular seasons of the show (all except for season 3 in 2002 which was hosted by Pepe Navarro, and season 17 in 2016 which was hosted by Jorge Javier Vázquez) and two All Stars seasons.

In 2016 she hosted a TV program named Convénzeme, con Z de Zweig which motivates people to read.

In 2012 she published a book based on the blog she writes in Telecinco named Lo que me sale del bolo.

In February 2019 she will host the TV program Scott y Mila in Movistar+.

Shows

Televisión Española 
 Polideportivo (1974–1978)
 Dos por dos (1978)
 Buenas noches (1982–1984)
 De jueves a jueves (1986)
 El martes que viene (1990)

TV3 
 Dilluns, dilluns (1988)

Antena 3 
 Queremos saber (1992–1993)
 Más que palabras (1995)
 Sin límites (1998)
 Queremos saber más (2002)

Telecinco 
 Gran Hermano (2000–2015) (excluding Gran Hermano 3 and the VIP seasons)
 Diario de... (2004–2011)
 La tribu (2009) with Javier Sardá

Cuatro 
 Diario de... (2011–)
 El comecocos (2011) as a judge

References

External links

 
 

Gran Hermano (Spanish TV series)
Spanish television personalities
Living people
1951 births
Spanish television journalists